Mount Arlan (Uly Balkan Gerşi) is an  peak in the western plains of Turkmenistan in Balkan Province. Mount Arlan stands about 2,000 metres above the shore of the below-sea level Caspian Sea.
It is the highest point of the Balkan Daglary range.
The town of Balkanabat, the capital of Balkan Province, lies 25 km to the southwest.

See also 
 List of Ultras of Central Asia

Notes

External links 
 

Balkan Daglary